The 1920 Utah gubernatorial election was held on November 2, 1920. Republican nominee Charles R. Mabey defeated Democratic nominee Thomas N. Taylor with 57.59% of the vote.

General election

Candidates
Major party candidates
Charles R. Mabey, Republican 
Thomas N. Taylor, Democratic

Other candidates
E. B. Locke, Socialist
George Crosby, Farmer–Labor

Results

References

1920
Utah
Gubernatorial